"Sexcrime (Nineteen Eighty-Four)" is a song written and performed by the British duo Eurythmics. It was released as the first single from their album 1984 (For the Love of Big Brother), which served as the soundtrack to the film Nineteen Eighty-Four, an adaptation of the novel of the same name by George Orwell. The song was produced by Dave Stewart.

Background and performance
"Sexcrime" is a song which features heavy sampling of Lennox's voice, utilizing snippets of her vocal performance to produce a stuttering effect. Also prominently featured is the voice of Stewart, with the aid of a vocoder, uttering the phrase "nineteen eighty four". It was the first of two singles released from the soundtrack album. The term "sexcrime" is one of several Newspeak words found within the novel.

The song was originally intended to appear in the film 1984, but was dropped prior to the film's release. However, it was used as background music for the film's trailer, and the song's promotional video was included on home video releases of the film.

In addition to the standard 7" and 12" formats, the song was also released as a limited edition 12" picture disc.

Cash Box called it a "fascinating song" that is "somewhat constrained" by the Eurythmics' practice of writing songs using few notes.  Billboard called it a "compelling dance track...with its aura of doomy foreboding [and] touches of humor."

Chart performance
The single peaked at number 4 on the UK Singles Chart, becoming Eurythmics' sixth consecutive Top 10 hit. It was one of the duo's biggest selling singles in the UK, being certified Silver by the BPI for sales in excess of 250,000 copies. It was also a big hit throughout Europe, a top 10 hit in New Zealand, a top 20 hit in Canada, and one of the duo's biggest selling singles in Australia.

"Sexcrime" met with strong resistance on United States radio and on video outlets such as MTV – the song's title was particularly controversial to those who were not aware of the meaning of the word in Orwell's novel. The music video (featuring a straightforward performance of the song by Lennox and Stewart) had limited rotation on MTV. "Sexcrime" peaked at number 81 on the Billboard Hot 100, but was much more successful on the US Hot Dance Club Play chart, where it reached number 2.

Track listings

7"
A: "Sexcrime (1984)" (LP Version) – 3:57
B: "I Did It Just The Same" (LP Version) – 3:32

12"
A: "Sexcrime (1984)" (Extended Mix) – 8:01
B1: "Sexcrime (1984)" (LP Version) – 3:57
B2: "I Did It Just the Same" (LP Version) – 3:32

3" CD Re-Issue
A: "Sexcrime (1984)" (Extended Mix) – 8:01
B1: "Julia" (LP Version) – 6:38
B2: "I Did It Just the Same" (LP Version) – 3:32

Charts

Weekly charts

Year-end charts

Certifications

References

1984 songs
1984 singles
Eurythmics songs
Music based on Nineteen Eighty-Four
RCA Records singles
Songs written for films
Songs written by Annie Lennox
Songs written by David A. Stewart
Song recordings produced by Dave Stewart (musician and producer)
Virgin Records singles